KSRF (95.9 FM) "HI95" is a radio station broadcasting a Contemporary Hawaiian and Reggae format.

Licensed to Poipu, Hawaii, United States, the station serves the island of Kaua'i at 95.9 FM and the island's North Shore with a translator at 103.9 FM from Princeville, and also streams Kauai's Local Hits online at www.hi95kauai.com.

The station uses the branding "HI95 - Today's Island Hits" and is currently owned by Pacific Media Group Hawaii since October 2018. Pacific Media Group's Kauai Office and studios are located on Halenani Street in Lihue, Kauai. PMG's Kauai stations also include KUAI Country, Shaka Rocks 103, and KQNG Radio.

References

External links
Pacific Media Group Website

SRF
Hawaiian-music formatted radio stations
Kauai
Contemporary hit radio stations in the United States